Landon Rice (born February 28, 1988) is a professional Canadian football offensive lineman for the Montreal Alouettes of the Canadian Football League (CFL). He played CIS football at the University of Manitoba and attended Crocus Plains Regional Secondary School in Brandon, Manitoba.

Early years
Rice played high school football for the Crocus Plains Regional Secondary School Plainsmen as an offensive and defensive lineman on the 9-man football team. He won the Canada Cup in 2005 as a member of Team Manitoba.

College career
Rice played for the Manitoba Bisons from 2007 to 2012. The Bisons won the 43rd Vanier Cup in 2007. He participated in the 2008 CIS East-West Bowl. Rice was named a team captain in 2011 and 2012.

Professional career
Rice signed with the Hamilton Tiger-Cats on April 2, 2013 as an undrafted free agent and spent that season on the practice roster. He made his CFL debut on June 26, 2014 and made his first career start on July 4, 2014.

On July 22, 2018, Rice was traded with teammate Tony Washington to the Montreal Alouettes in the blockbuster Johnny Manziel deal. He played in four games with the Alouettes, including two starts at right guard, before being released on August 23, 2018. He was then signed by the Tiger-Cats again on August 28, 2018. He played in 14 regular season games, including one start, for the Tiger-Cats. He became a free agent during the following off-season.

On July 27, 2019, he re-signed with the Alouettes to a one-year contract. He re-signed with the team again on December 16, 2020.

References

External links
Montreal Alouettes bio

Living people
1988 births
Players of Canadian football from Manitoba
Canadian football offensive linemen
Manitoba Bisons football players
Hamilton Tiger-Cats players
Sportspeople from Brandon, Manitoba
Montreal Alouettes players